F-Zero: Maximum Velocity is a futuristic racing video game developed by NDcube and published by Nintendo as a launch title for the Game Boy Advance. The game was released in Japan, North America and Europe in 2001. It is the first F-Zero game to be released on a handheld game console.

Maximum Velocity takes place twenty-five years after F-Zero, in another F-Zero Grand Prix. The past generations of F-Zero had "piloted their way to fame", so it is the second F-Zero game without Captain Falcon, Samurai Goroh, Pico, or Dr. Stewart after the game BS F-Zero Grand Prix 2. Players control fast hovering crafts and use their speed-boosting abilities to navigate through the courses as quickly as possible.

Gameplay

Every race consists of five laps around a race track. Players lose the race if their machine explodes due to taking too much damage, or if they land outside of the track, get ejected from the race due to falling to 20th place, complete a lap with a rank outside of the rank limit of that lap, or forfeit. In the single player Grand Prix mode, all of these conditions require the player to possess and use an extra machine to try again.

For each lap completed the player is rewarded with a speed boost, to be used once any time; one of the "SSS" marks will be shaded green to indicate that it can be used. A boost will dramatically increase a player's speed, but will decrease their ability to turn. A boost used before a jump will make the player jump farther, which could allow the player to use a shortcut with the right vehicle. Boost time and speed varies according to the machine, and is usually tuned for proper balance. For example, one machine boasts a boost time of twelve seconds, yet has the slowest boost speed of the entire game. Players can also take advantage of the varying deceleration of each vehicle. Some vehicles, such as the Jet Vermilion, take longer than others to decelerate from top boost speed to normal speed, once the boost has been used up. Players can also take advantage of this effect on boost pads.

The Grand Prix is the main single player component of Maximum Velocity. It consists of four series named after chess pieces: "Pawn", "Knight", "Bishop" and "Queen".  The latter of these can be unlocked by winning the others on "Expert" mode. They have five races in four difficulty settings, "Master" mode is unlocked by winning expert mode in each series, the player unlocks a new machine after completing it. The player needs to be in the top three at the end of the last lap in order to continue to the next race. If the player is unable to continue, the player will lose a machine and can try the race again. If the player runs out of machines, then the game ends, and the player has to start the series from the beginning.

Championship is another single player component. It is basically the same as a "Time Attack" mode, except the player can only race on one, special course: the Synobazz Championship Circuit. This special course is not selectable in any other modes.

Multiplayer
Maximum Velocity can be played in two multiplayer modes using the Game Boy Advance link cable, with one cartridge, or one cartridge per player. Two to four players can play in both modes.

In single cart, only one player needs to have a cartridge. The other players will boot off the link cable network from the player with the cart using the GBA's netboot capability. All players drive a generic craft, and the game can only be played on one level, Silence. Silence, along with Fire Field, are the only areas to return from previous games. Aptly, Silence in Maximum Velocity has no background music, unlike in most other F-Zero games.

In multi cart, each player needs to have a cartridge to play. This has many advantages over single cart: All players can use any machine in this game that has been unlocked by another player. Players can select any course in this game. After the race is finished, all of the players' ranking data are mixed and shared ("Mixed ranking" stored in each cart).

Development

F-Zero: Maximum Velocity is one of the first titles to have been developed by NDcube. Like the original F-Zero for SNES, Maximum Velocity implements a pseudo-3D visual technique based on the scaling and rotation effects of bitmap graphics. In this game, this technique consists of a double layer, one of which gives the illusion of depth.

Release
Maximum Velocity is one of ten Game Boy Advance games released on December 16, 2011, to Nintendo 3DS Ambassadors, a program to give free downloadable games to early adopters who bought a Nintendo 3DS before its price drop. It was also released on the Wii U Virtual Console on April 3, 2014, in Japan and April 17 in North America and Europe, and will be released on the Nintendo Switch Online + Expansion Pack service in 2023.

Reception

The game received "generally favorable reviews" according to the review aggregation website Metacritic. NextGen, however, called it "A classic SNES racer that ports well, although the look is definitely dated." In Japan, Famitsu gave it a score of 31 out of 40.

The game went on to sell 334,145 units in Japan and 273,229 units in the U.S. as of 2005. The game has total sales of over 1 million units worldwide.

Notes

References

External links
Official website

2001 video games
Maximum Velocity
Game Boy Advance games
Multiplayer and single-player video games
NDcube games
Nintendo Switch Online games
Video games developed in Japan
Video games set on fictional planets
Virtual Console games for Nintendo 3DS
Virtual Console games for Wii U
Virtual Console games